Yao Jie (Chinese: 姚捷; born 21 September 1990) is a male Chinese athlete specialising in the pole vault. He competed at the 2015 World Championships in Beijing without qualifying for the final.  He also competed at the 2016 Olympics.  He cleared the minimum height the other finalists cleared, 5.60m, but his one miss relegated him to a non-qualifying 14th place.

His personal bests in the event are 5.71 metres outdoors (Luoyang 2019) and 5.50 metres indoors (Nanjing 2013).

Competition record

1No mark in the final

References

External links

Chinese male pole vaulters
Living people
Place of birth missing (living people)
1990 births
World Athletics Championships athletes for China
Athletes (track and field) at the 2016 Summer Olympics
Athletes (track and field) at the 2018 Asian Games
Olympic athletes of China
Asian Games medalists in athletics (track and field)
Asian Games silver medalists for China
Medalists at the 2018 Asian Games